Adams Township, South Dakota may refer to the following places:

 Adams Township, Grant County, South Dakota
 Adams Township, Miner County, South Dakota

See also

Adams Township (disambiguation)

South Dakota township disambiguation pages